The 1942 Stanford Indians football team represented Stanford University in the 1942 college football season and was led by first-year head coach Marchmont Schwartz. With the United States now fully engaged in World War II, Stanford played three "home" games at Kezar Stadium in San Francisco in order to comply with wartime requirements to minimize the use of non-essential public transportation by holding events near population centers. The team also played four games at its usual home stadium, Stanford Stadium.

Stanford suspended football after this season, resuming in 1946.

Schedule

Players drafted by the NFL

References

Stanford
Stanford Cardinal football seasons
Stanford Indians football